San Acacia is a small unincorporated community and census-designated place in Socorro County, New Mexico, United States. It was once a prosperous railway town, but is now largely deserted. There is a nearby diversion dam on the Rio Grande, important in irrigation.

Location
The village lies on the Rio Grande in the Albuquerque Basin. It is off Interstate 25 at exit 163. San Acacia is near the southern boundary of the Sevilleta National Wildlife Refuge. San Acacia gives its name to the stretch of the Rio Grande that extends south to the Elephant Butte Reservoir. The nearby San Acacia Diversion Dam is used to transfer water from the river into irrigation channels. When the river is low, the Isleta Diversion Dam, further to the north, and the San Acacia dam can divert all water from the Rio Grande along a  stretch of the river.

Foundation and growth
The settlement of San Acacio was named by the Spanish after Saint Acacius, leader of the ten thousand martyrs of Mount Ararat, an early Christian saint who was crowned with thorns from the acacia tree. The hill to the east of the San Acacio cemetery was the location where, in 1855, John W. Garretson fixed the Initial Point for the Principal Meridian and the Base Line. This is the reference point for all topographic maps of the state of New Mexico.

San Acacio became important in 1878 when the Atchison, Topeka and Santa Fe Railway was built through Socorro County on its route along the Rio Grande to El Paso, Texas. It was incorrectly given the official name of San Acacia after the railway came through.

Flooding and decline
The Rio Grande has very variable volumes where it passes San Acacia. In the summer, most of the water comes from unpredictable flash floods carried into the river by ephemeral tributaries. The town lies a few  miles south of the point where the Rio Puerco and Rio Salado converge with the Rio Grande. In August 1929 there were torrential rains in the watersheds of these rivers, causing flooding that extended from San Acacia to San Marcial. There was renewed flooding a months later, damaging the railway and destroying all the crops in the valley.
Once a prosperous town, many of the buildings including the old church have been abandoned.

Dam
In 1906 the narrow gorge at San Acacia was being considered for a dam. The drawback was that the basalt that forms the walls of the gorge is a thin sheet resting on loose sand and gravel. It seemed unlikely that there would be solid rock near enough to the surface to form a foundation for the dam, and there would be considerable leakage through the gravels.

A diversion dam was built in 1934 for the Middle Rio Grande Conservancy District, and was rehabilitated by the United States Bureau of Reclamation in 1957 as part of the Middle Rio Grande Project. A 2003 report noted that there had been silting upstream of the dam but the width of the downstream channels had decreased sharply since the diversion dam was built. The river has cut a deeper channel in its bed and now runs faster. This made it harder for fish to travel upstream. The report suggested that if eight Gradient Restoration Facilities were installed in the downstream reach, that should be enough to slow the water, allowing sediment to settle and making fish passage easier. A 2005 report considered removing the dam altogether. Again, it suggested emplacement of Gradient Restoration Facilities to control erosion as sediment above and below the dam returned to normal levels.

Education
It is within Socorro Consolidated Schools. Socorro High School is the comprehensive high school of the district.

References
Citations

Sources

Census-designated places in New Mexico
Census-designated places in Socorro County, New Mexico
Unincorporated communities in Socorro County, New Mexico
Unincorporated communities in New Mexico
Albuquerque metropolitan area